The Tjurabalan (Jura-palan) is a nomadic desert tribe from the edge of the Tanami Desert near Sturt Creek and The Paraku Lake system, Lake Gregory in the Kimberley region of Western Australia.

Language
The language jurisdictions governing much of Tjurabalan territory are provided by Djaru and Walmajarri.

Society
The combined population of the tribe in 2003 was approximately 1200 people.

Country
The Tjurabalan dwell in the Tanami Desert, in proximity to the Ngurrara, and encompasses the communities of Ringer Soak (Kundat Djaru), Billiluna, Mulan and Balgo. The Coyote Gold Mine is also located within the native title of the Tjurabalan people.

History
The explorers David Carnegie and Alfred Canning crossed their region, both being in the habit of capturing aboriginals and coercing them into revealing where fresh water springs might be found. Carnegie denied them water until their thirst made them collaborate. Canning had chains and neck padlocks manufactured which he applied to kidnapped Tjurabalan people in order to force them to guide his party to water.

Oral tradition of a massacre of the local Tjurabalan people by white settlers was corroborated by forensic archaeological investigations in 2017.

The Tjurabalan did not have much contact with whites until the 1950s since no extensive development projects had been envisaged for their area down to that time.

Native title

Notes

Citations

Sources

Aboriginal peoples of Western Australia
Pilbara